Vianania aymara is a moth in the subfamily Arctiinae. It was described by Orfila in 1954. It is found in Bolivia.

References

Moths described in 1954
Lithosiini